Atractus insipidus is a species of snake in the family Colubridae. The species can be found in Venezuela and Brazil.

References 

Atractus
Reptiles of Venezuela
Reptiles of Brazil
Reptiles described in 1961
Taxa named by Janis Roze